Mawdud ibn Altuntash (also spelled Maudud or Sharaf al-Dawla Mawdûd) (died October 2, 1113) was a Turkic military leader who was atabeg of Mosul from 1109 to 1113. He organized several expeditions to reconquer lands from the Crusaders and defeated them at  Battle of Al-Sannabra

Biography
Mawdud was an officer of Muhammad I Tapar who sent him to reconquer Mosul from the rebel atabeg Jawali Saqawa. After his conquest of the city, Mehmed entrusted him with several military attempts to push back the Crusaders from the nearby Principality of Antioch and County of Edessa. The first attempt was launched in 1110; having joined forces with Ilghazi, the emir of Mardin, and of Sökmen el-Kutbî, emir of Ahlat, they began by besieging Edessa from April of that year, but Baldwin I of Jerusalem intervened, and forced Mawdud to retreat.

The following year Mawdud marched against Edessa, but as the city walls had been quickly strengthened, he preferred to lay siege to the town of Turbessel, held by Joscelin I of Courtenay. When Ridwan of Aleppo sent news that the Christians under Tancred were on the verge of capturing Aleppo, he moved on to that city. On his arrival, however, he discovered that the capture of the city was not imminent at all, and that Ridwan even refused to open the city's gates for him. He also received the news that a relief army which had been sent by Baldwin I was now marching northwards, so he raised the siege of Turbessel and the subsequent Battle of Shaizar in 1111 proved to be indecisive and a tactical draw.

The 1112 campaign began again with the siege of Turbessel, but was halted when a party of the Mosul army was decimated by Joscelin on June 15. An attempt to capture Edessa with the assistance of its Armenian population was discovered by then count Baldwin II of Jerusalem, resulting in the slaughter of the Armenian participants.

In 1113 Toghtekin of Damascus, tired of the ravages by the Christian forces against his territories, appealed to Mawdud to join him to invade the Kingdom of Jerusalem. The two pillaged Galilee and besieged Tiberias, though without being able to capture it. On June 28, however, the Muslims defeated King Baldwin I of Jerusalem's army at the Battle of Al-Sannabra. Reinforcements saved the Christian forces from total annihilation and prevented the Muslim commanders from exploiting the victory, and ultimately forced them to retreat to Damascus due to a lack of supplies.

It was while in Damascus as a guest of Toghtekin that Mawdud was murdered by the Assassins, possibly with the knowledge of his host.  He was succeeded as atabeg by Aqsunqur al-Bursuqi, his representative at Baghdad.

References

Sources

11th-century births
1113 deaths
Turkic rulers
Muslims of the First Crusade
Assassinated royalty
11th-century Turkic people
Emirs of Mosul
People of the Nizari–Seljuk wars
Victims of the Order of Assassins